Pacher is an Austrian surname. It may refer to:

David Pacher (1816–1902), Austrian priest and botanist
Franz Pacher (born 1919), Austrian engineer
Quentin Pacher (born 1992), French cyclist 
Michael Pacher (1435–1498), Austrian painter and sculptor

See also
Hasani Pacher, village in Iran